Zoza is a commune in the Corse-du-Sud department of France on the island of Corsica.

Geography
The river Rizzanese runs through the village which is located 88 km from Ajaccio.

Population

See also
Communes of the Corse-du-Sud department

References

Communes of Corse-du-Sud